Dichomeris dignella is a moth in the family Gelechiidae. It was described by Walsingham in 1911. It is found in Mexico (Guerrero).

The forewings are pale ochreous, sprinkled and spotted with greyish fuscous, of which there is also a distinct streak along the base of the costa. One spot is found on the upper edge of the fold at one-fifth, another on the cell at two-fifths, slightly preceded by a third beneath it, one at the end of the cell, and another on the costa at the commencement of the cilia. The sprinkling is scantily distributed, but
somewhat thickened along the middle of the costa, in a transverse band along the middle, along the dorsum as far as the band, and again along the termen. The hindwings are pale bluish grey.

References

Moths described in 1911
dignella